Chapadão do Céu is a municipality in southwestern Goiás state, Brazil.  It is a large producer of grains (soybeans and corn) and has a high standard of living.

Geographical Information
It is located on the dividing line between the states of Mato Grosso do Sul and Goiás. The distance to the state capital, Goiânia, is 467 km.  Connecting highways are BR-060 / Guapó / Cezarina / Indiara / Acreúna / Rio Verde / Jataí / GO-050 (40 km unpaved road).  Distances to other towns are:  50 km. to Chapadão do Sul; 109 km. to Mineiros; 106 km. to Jataí; 255 km. to Rio Verde; and 451 km. to Itumbiara.

Municipal boundaries are with:
North: Serranópolis and Mineiros; 
West:  Mineiros and Costa Rica (MS); 
South:  Chapadão do Sul (MS); 
East: Aporé. 
For a map see Chapadaodoceu

Demographic and Political Data
Population growth rate 1996/2000:  9.48%
Population growth rate 2000/2007:  4.92%
Mayor (Prefeito)--Eduardo Pagnocelli Peixoto
Vice-mayor (Vice-Prefeito)--Paulo Rodrigues da Cunha
City council (Vereadores): 09

Economy
Despite the low fertility of the soil, the region has agricultural potential because of the flat land and abundance of water.  There are plantations of soybeans, corn, and rice, which show good averages of productivity after soil correction, modern techniques, and the use of advanced machines and equipment are applied.  In 2006 there were 126 agricultural installations with 56,140 hectares of planted area.  Only 36 of these farms had cattle.  Forty five of the farms had tractors.

Economic Activity
Industrial units: 08  (2007)
Retail units: 113
Financial institutions: Banco do Brasil S.A.

Agricultural Production (2006)
cattle: 19,000 head
cotton:  6,945 hectares
corn: 33,911 hectares
soybeans: 101,946 hectares
sorghum: 20,000 hectares
Data are from 2006 and can be found at IBGE

Best quality of life in Goiás
Chapadão is becoming one of the state's biggest producers of soybeans and corn.  It was also singled out in 2003 as having the highest ranking  in the state of Goiás on the United Nations Human Development Index.chapadaodoceu  The index was 0.834, ranking Chapadão 1 out of 242 municipalities in Goiás and 100 out of 5,507 municipalities in the country.  All the water in the town is treated, all the children go to public school, and there is almost zero infant mortality. See Human Development Index

Education and Health
Literacy rate in 2000: 95.1% (the highest in the state)
Schools: 07 (2006) with 1,987 students
Infant mortality rate in 2000: 11.36 in 1,000 live births
Hospitals: 01 with 14 beds (2007)
Public health clinics: 04

Climate and Tourism
Chapadão do Céu has about 32% of its total area in reserves, including the Parque Nacional das Emas, legal reserves (20% of rural properties) and permanent reserves (river banks, streams, and springs).

The climate is moist tropical with an average annual temperature between 19 °C and 37 °C.  The relative air humidity is around 55%.
The region is watered by the following rivers: Água Amarela, Aporé, Corrente, Formoso, Jacuba, Prata, Pratinha and Sucuriú.  The municipality is the gateway to the largest preserved area of the cerrado bioma in the world:  the Parque Nacional das Emas, with its rich variety of flowers, plants, animals, birds, and beautiful landscapes.

See also
List of municipalities in Goiás
Microregions of Goiás

References

 Frigoletto

External links

Municipalities in Goiás